Charles Kohler (9 October 1900 – 8 December 1979) was a Swiss-born Romanian football striker.

International career
Charles Kohler played one game at international level for Romania in a 1925 friendly which ended with a 2–1 loss against Turkey.

Honours
Tricolor București
Divizia A: 1920–21

References

1900 births
1979 deaths
Romanian footballers
Romania international footballers
FC Petrolul Ploiești players
Unirea Tricolor București players
Association football forwards
Naturalised citizens of Romania
Footballers from Geneva
Swiss emigrants to Romania